Chambles is a commune in the Loire department in central France. The commune has an area of 18.90 km2 and its altitude ranges from 360 to 741 meters. As of 2019, there were 522 dwellings in Chambles, of which 420 main residences.

Population

See also
Communes of the Loire department

References

Communes of Loire (department)